Dinushka Malan (born 13 June 1993) is a Sri Lankan cricketer. He made his Twenty20 debut for Lankan Cricket Club in the 2017–18 SLC Twenty20 Tournament on 24 February 2018. He made his List A debut for Lankan Cricket Club in the 2017–18 Premier Limited Overs Tournament on 18 March 2017.

References

External links
 

1993 births
Living people
Sri Lankan cricketers
Lankan Cricket Club cricketers
Place of birth missing (living people)